Charles Albert Trouncer (14 August 1866 – 13 March 1938) was an English first-class cricketer active 1887–90 who played for Surrey and Cambridge University. He was born in Uckfield; died in Anglesey.

References 

1866 births
1938 deaths
English cricketers
Surrey cricketers
Cambridge University cricketers